Elizabeth Whitney may refer to: 

 Elizabeth Whitney (treasurer), California state treasurer 1987-1989
 Elizabeth Ann Whitney, early Mormon leader in the Relief Society
Elizabeth Whitney Williams, lighthouse keeper from 1872-1913